Luke Aaron Bronin (born June 30, 1979) is an American politician and lawyer who is the 67th and current Mayor of Hartford, Connecticut, since January 1, 2016. 

He previously served as general counsel for the Connecticut Governor Dannel Malloy. Before that, he served in two senior posts at the United States Department of the Treasury during President Barack Obama's first term: as Senior Advisor to the Deputy Secretary of the Treasury and then as Deputy Assistant Secretary of the Treasury for Terrorist Financing and Financial Crimes.

Bronin has served as an officer in the U.S. Navy Reserve, and was deployed to Afghanistan and assigned to the Anti-Corruption Task Force. He also worked in the private sector, at The Hartford Financial Services Group, as chief of staff to the President of the Hartford's Property and Casualty Division. In December 2014, the law firm Hinckley Allen & Snyder LLP announced Bronin would become a partner. He is a member of the Democratic Party.

Early life and education 

Bronin was born in Westchester County, New York and completed high school at Phillips Exeter Academy in New Hampshire before he attended Yale University as an undergraduate. Upon graduation he attended the Balliol College, Oxford as a Rhodes Scholar. He returned to the United States to earn a J.D. degree at Yale Law School.

Career 
After graduation from Yale Law School, Bronin joined The Hartford Insurance Company in the Asylum Hill neighborhood of Hartford, where he worked first as associate counsel and assistant to the general counsel, and then as chief of staff to the President of The Hartford's Property and Casualty Division Neal Wolin. He is a partner at the private law firm Hinckley Allen LLP.

Early political work 
In 2004, Bronin ran the re-election campaign of Democratic state senator Andrew J. McDonald. McDonald went on to become the first Connecticut Supreme Court Justice from the LGBT community.

In 2006, Bronin served as deputy campaign manager for Dannel Malloy's run for Governor of Connecticut.

Military service 

Bronin served as a commissioned intelligence officer in the Navy Reserve.  He was a member of the military's anti-corruption task force during his deployment to Afghanistan from September 2010 to April 2011. He left active service as a lieutenant.

Obama administration 

During the first term of President Barack Obama's administration, Bronin served in appointed positions at the U.S. Department of the Treasury. He first served as Senior Advisor to his former boss, the Deputy Secretary of the United States Treasury Neal Wolin.

Bronin was then named Deputy Assistant Secretary of the Treasury for Terrorist Financing and Financial Crimes. He also testified before Congress in his official capacity.

Mayor of Hartford 
Before running for mayor, Bronin joined the Governor Dannel Malloy's administration as general counsel in January 2013.

In 2015, he ran in and won the Democratic primary in the Hartford Mayoral election against an incumbent, Mayor Pedro Segarra. In July 2015, the Hartford Democratic Town Council endorsed Bronin. Then, in a September 2015 primary, he defeated Mayor Segarra by a ten-point margin. Following the primary victory, he was endorsed by Connecticut Governor Dannel Malloy and Senators Richard Blumenthal and Chris Murphy. He won the general election on November 3, 2015.

Although he pledged that he would serve out his full term as Mayor of Hartford, in December 2017, Bronin formed an exploratory committee to run for Governor of Connecticut in 2018. He abandoned his bid in April 2018 after failing to gain traction.  During his campaign, he was criticized for soliciting campaign donations from Hartford public employees using their government email accounts, a misstep that led to a complaint with the Connecticut Elections Enforcement Commission.

In January 2019, Bronin announced he would seek reelection for Mayor of Hartford. He faced challenges in the Democratic primary from former Mayor Eddie Perez, first elected in 2001 but who resigned from office in 2010 after being convicted on corruption charges, and Connecticut State Representative Brandon McGee. Bronin coasted to victory during the September 10 Democratic primary, capturing nearly 60% of the vote. Perez challenged Bronin again in the general election as an independent candidate Several other challengers faced Bronin in the November 5 general election. They were TV entrepreneur J. Stan McCauley, a Democrat who was cross-endorsed by the Hartford Republican Town Committee and will appear on the Republican line in the general election; Aaron Lewis, president and CEO of The Scribe’s Ink publishing service; and Giselle “Gigi” Jacobs, who owns a cleaning company, Sister Soldier Environmental Services. Lewis and Jacobs are also Democrats. Bronin won the general election by a broad margin, and was elected to a second term as mayor.

In 2022, Bronin announced he would not seek a third term as mayor.

Personal life 
Bronin is married to Sara Cecilia Galvan. They met when they were both Rhodes Scholars. She is a professor at University of Connecticut Law School and is a past president of the Connecticut Hispanic Bar Association. They have three children.

Bronin is a songwriter, guitarist, and singer, with a self-titled album of seven songs. One of his songs was played on the television show Dawson's Creek.

See also 

 Mayor of Hartford, Connecticut

References

External links

 Mayor Luke Bronin official government website
 Luke Bronin for Hartford campaign website
 
 

1979 births
21st-century American naval officers
21st-century American politicians
Alumni of Balliol College, Oxford
American male singer-songwriters
United States Navy personnel of the War in Afghanistan (2001–2021)
American Rhodes Scholars
Connecticut Democrats
Lawyers from Hartford, Connecticut
Living people
Mayors of Hartford, Connecticut
Obama administration personnel
People from Port Chester, New York
Phillips Exeter Academy alumni
Politicians from Hartford, Connecticut
United States Navy reservists
Yale College alumni
Yale Law School alumni
Singer-songwriters from Connecticut